Friedrich Knollenberg (born 6 October 1878 in Neuenkirchen-Vörden - died 30 December 1950 in Neuenkirchen) was a German politician. He was a member of the Christian Democratic Union of Germany (CDU). He was appointed to the Ernannter Oldenburgischer Landtag (de), a commission established after WWII by the British military government to control the State of Oldenburg (de), a historic territory in the northwest of Germany that reached statehood in the Middle Ages. He served as a member from the first session, on January 30, 1946 until the last session, on November 6, 1946. Other states were also controlled by similar commissions at the time.

References

1878 births
1950 deaths
Christian Democratic Union of Germany politicians
20th-century German politicians